Sofiia Nesterova (born 21 August 2003) is a retired Ukrainian pair skater. With her former partner, Artem Darenskyi, she is a two-time Ukrainian national senior champion. The pair has competed in the final segment at two World Junior Championships, finishing within the top eight at the 2019 edition.

Career

Early years 
Nesterova began learning to skate in 2006. In February 2017, she won the Ukrainian junior ladies' title ahead of Anastasia Arkhipova and Anastasia Hozhva. She was too young to compete as a junior internationally.

Before 2016, she also trained in pair skating with Denys Strekalin.

2017–2018 season 
Nesterova became age-eligible for junior international events at the start of the season. Coached by Maryna Amirkhanova in Kyiv, she competed at two ISU Junior Grand Prix assignments, placing 8th in Minsk, Belarus, and then 12th in Egna, Italy.

Around November 2017, Nesterova teamed up with Artem Darenskyi to compete in pairs, coached by Lilia Batutina in Dnipro. Their training was limited due to a leg injury sustained by Nesterova but the pair decided to compete at the Ukrainian Championships in December.

Nesterova/Darenskyi's international debut came in early February 2018 at the Toruń Cup in Poland. They won bronze and obtained the minimum technical scores required to compete at the 2018 World Junior Championships in Sofia. At the March event in Bulgaria, they qualified to the final segment and went on to finish 14th overall.

2018–2019 season 
Nesterova/Darenskyi competed at two ISU Junior Grand Prix events in September, placing fifth in Linz, Austria, and eighth in Ostrava, Czech Republic. In December, they won their second senior national title. Ranked eighth in both segments, they finished eighth at the 2019 World Junior Championships in March in Zagreb, Croatia.

2019–2020 season 
Nestrova/Darenski placed twelfth and tenth at their two JGP events. They were fifth at the Volvo Open Cup in November. In December, they were nineteenth at the 2019 CS Golden Spin of Zagreb. They placed third at Nationals. They were chosen to compete at the 2020 Youth Olympic Games. Their Junior Pairs result became disqualified, though they were part of the bronze-medalling winning team in the Team Event. They were disqualified at the 2020 European Championships.

On March 20, it was announced that Nestrova and Darenski were splitting up, as Nestrova had retired.

Programs

Pairs with Darenskyi

Ladies' singles

Competitive highlights 
CS: Challenger Series; JGP: Junior Grand Prix

Pairs with Darenskyi

Ladies' singles

References

External links 
 

2003 births
Ukrainian female pair skaters
Living people
Sportspeople from Dnipro
Figure skaters at the 2020 Winter Youth Olympics